This is a list of electricity-generating power stations in the U.S. state of West Virginia, sorted by type and name. In 2019, West Virginia had a total summer capacity of 14,868 MW through all of its power plants, and a net generation 
of 63,926 GWh.  The corresponding electrical energy generation mix was 91.0% coal, 3.6% natural gas, 2.7% hydroelectric, 2.5% wind, and 0.2% petroleum.

Fossil-fuel power stations
Data from the U.S. Energy Information Administration.

Coal

Natural gas

Petroleum

Renewable power stations
Data from the U.S. Energy Information Administration serves as a general reference.

Biomass & Refuse

Hydroelectric

Wind

Solar

West Virginia had no utility-scale solar facilities in 2019.

Storage power stations
Data from the U.S. Energy Information Administration serves as a general reference.

Battery storage

See also

 List of power stations in the United States

References

Energy infrastructure in West Virginia
West Virginia
 
Lists of buildings and structures in West Virginia